Danièle Hérin (born 14 January 1947) is a French computer scientist and politician of La République En Marche! (LREM) who was elected to the French National Assembly on 18 June 2017, representing Aude's 1st constituency.

Political career
After entering parliament, Hérin was one of the four deputy chairpersons of the LREM parliamentary group under the leadership of successive chairmen Richard Ferrand (2017-2018) and Gilles Le Gendre (since 2018). She also serves as member of the Committee on Cultural Affairs and Education. In addition to her committee assignments, she is part of the French-Estonian Parliamentary Friendship Group.

She lost her seat in the first round of the 2022 French legislative election.

Political positions
In July 2019, Hérin voted in favor of the French ratification of the European Union’s Comprehensive Economic and Trade Agreement (CETA) with Canada.

References

1947 births
Living people
People from Carcassonne
Deputies of the 15th National Assembly of the French Fifth Republic
Women members of the National Assembly (France)
La République En Marche! politicians
21st-century French women politicians
Chevaliers of the Ordre des Palmes Académiques